Allan Martin may refer to:
Allan Martin (rugby union) (born 1948), Wales and British Lions international rugby union player
Allan Martin (footballer) (1872–1906), Scottish footballer
A. W. Martin (Allan William Martin, 1926–2002), Australian historian
Allan W. Martin (1874–1942), member of the Vermont House of Representatives and the Vermont Senate

See also
Alan Martin (disambiguation)
Allen Martin (1844–1924), English sailor who founded a private school at Port Adelaide